

News 
The  Ontario Rugby Football Union (ORFU) adopted the Burnside Rules which reduced teams to 12 men per side, put into play the snap-back system of moving the ball, required the offensive team to gain 10 yards on three downs, abolished the throw-in from the sidelines, permitted only six men on the line, stated that all goals by kicking were to be worth two points, and the opposition was to line up 10 yards from the defenders on all kicks. The rules were to be made uniform across the country as quickly as possible. The Canadian Intercollegiate Rugby Football Union (CIRFU), Quebec Rugby Football Union (QRFU) and Canadian Rugby Union (CRU) refused to adopt the new Rules.

QRFU and CRU reduced their rosters from 15 to 14 players. CRU ruled that possession could not go beyond three scrimmages unless during the third scrimmage the ball was moved five yards on a run or a kick. Ottawa returned to the QRFU and the Manitoba Rugby Football Union (MRFU) moved to a fall schedule.

Regular season

Final regular season standings
Note: GP = games played, W = wins, L = losses, T = ties, PF = points for, PA = points against, Pts = points

League champions

Playoffs
No Dominion Final was played this year due to a rules dispute over the newly adopted Burnside Rules used by the ORFU.

References

 
Canadian Football League seasons